T. V. Venkataswamy is the former member of Karnataka Legislative Council and the founder of Madhugiri Education Society.

References

Living people
Members of the Karnataka Legislative Council
Year of birth missing (living people)